Bukit Payung–Telemung Highway is a major highway in Terengganu, Malaysia. This highway is part of the Package 11 and 12 of the East Coast Expressway Phase 2 project (Jabur - Kuala Terengganu).

At most sections, the highway was built under the JKR R5 road standard, allowing maximum speed limit of up to 90 km/h.

List of interchanges 

Highways in Malaysia
Malaysian Federal Roads